The 2017–18 MRF Challenge Formula 2000 Championship was the fifth running of the MRF Challenge Formula 2000 Championship. It began on 16 November 2017 at the Bahrain International Circuit in Sakhir, Bahrain and ended on 4 February 2018 at the Madras Motor Racing Track in Chennai, India. The series consisted of 16 races spread across four meetings, with the first round in Bahrain being a support event to the FIA World Endurance Championship.

Drivers

Calendar and results

Championship standings

Scoring system

Drivers' standings

References

External links
 

2017–2018
MRF Challenge
MRF Challenge
MRF Challenge
MRF Challenge
MRF Challenge